Symplocos cochinchinensis is a species of flowering plant in the sapphire-berry family Symplocaceae, native to tropical and subtropical Asia. The widespread Symplocos cochinchinensis subsp./var. laurina is now considered a synonym of Symplocos acuminata.

Subtaxa
The following subspecies and varieties are accepted:

Symplocos cochinchinensis var. aneityensis (Brand) Noot. – Vanuatu
Symplocos cochinchinensis var. angustifolia (Guillaumin) Noot. – Hainan, Vietnam
Symplocos cochinchinensis var. doormannensis (Brand) Noot. – New Guinea
Symplocos cochinchinensis var. floresana Noot. – Flores
Symplocos cochinchinensis var. glaberrima Noot. – Queensland
Symplocos cochinchinensis var. imbricata (Brand) Noot. – Luzon
Symplocos cochinchinensis var. insularis Noot. – Papua New Guinea
Symplocos cochinchinensis subsp. leptophylla (Brand) Noot. – Bismarck Archipelago, Fiji, Maluku Islands, New Guinea, Santa Cruz Islands, Solomon Islands
Symplocos cochinchinensis var. longilobata Noot. – Papua New Guinea
Symplocos cochinchinensis var. molobros (Brand) Noot. – New Guinea
Symplocos cochinchinensis var. monticola Noot. – Papua New Guinea
Symplocos cochinchinensis var. orbicularis (Hemsl.) Noot. – New Guinea
Symplocos cochinchinensis var. ovata Noot. – Papua New Guinea
Symplocos cochinchinensis var. parvifolia Noot. – Papua New Guinea
Symplocos cochinchinensis var. pedicellata Noot. – Papua New Guinea
Symplocos cochinchinensis var. philippinensis (Brand) Noot. – Java, Lesser Sunda Islands, Maluku Islands, Philippines, Sulawesi, Taiwan
Symplocos cochinchinensis var. reginae (Brand) Noot. – New Guinea
Symplocos cochinchinensis var. revoluta Noot. – New Guinea
Symplocos cochinchinensis var. schumanniana (Brand) Noot. – Bismarck Archipelago, Maluku Islands, New Guinea
Symplocos cochinchinensis var. sessifolia (Blume) Noot. – west and central Java
Symplocos cochinchinensis var. sogeriensis (Brand) Noot. – New Guinea
Symplocos cochinchinensis var. tomentosa Noot. – Louisiade Archipelago
Symplocos cochinchinensis var. versteegii (Brand) Noot. – New Guinea

References

cochinchinensis
Flora of Nepal
Flora of East Himalaya
Flora of Assam (region)
Flora of Tibet
Flora of South-Central China
Flora of Southeast China
Flora of Hainan
Flora of Indo-China
Flora of Malesia
Flora of New Guinea
Flora of the Solomon Islands (archipelago)
Flora of Taiwan
Flora of the Ryukyu Islands
Flora of Japan
Plants described in 1914